Cocytius antaeus, the giant sphinx, is a moth of the family Sphingidae. The species was first described by Dru Drury in 1773.

Distribution 
It is found from Brazil through Central America and into the southern parts of California, Texas, and Florida in the United States.

Description 
The wingspan is 126–178 mm. Very rare in North America, it was once thought to be the only insect in the continent with a long enough proboscis to pollinate the similarly rare ghost orchid.

Biology 
The larvae feed on Annona glabra, Annona reticulata, Annona purpurea, Annona holosericea and Rollinia membranacea.

References

External links

Sphingini
Moths described in 1773
Sphingidae of South America
Moths of South America
Taxa named by Dru Drury